Kill Johnny Glendenning is a Scottish comedy crime thriller play written by D C Jackson. It made its world premiere at the Royal Lyceum Theatre, Edinburgh in September 2014, before transferring to the Citizens Theatre, Glasgow.

Production history
Kill Johnny Glendenning is written by Scottish playwright D C Jackson. On 15 May 2014, it was announced the play would premiere as part of the Lyceum Theatre's 2014-15 season and would begin previews at the Royal Lyceum Theatre, Edinburgh on 17 September 2014, with an official opening night on 20 September, booking for a limited period until 11 October. Jackson had begun writing the piece two years earlier, without a commission, having feared it was unlikely to generate one due to a productions perceived cost, but also the creative freedom working without one allowed him as a playwright. Lead casting for the production included Northern Irish actor and playwright David Ireland as Johnny Glendenning and former River City actor Paul Samson as Andrew MacPherson.

The play is directed by Mark Thomson, with design by Michael Taylor, lighting design by Tim Mascall and fight direction by Rachel Bown-Williams and Ruth Cooper–Brown. Following its premiere production the play is scheduled to transfer to the Citizens Theatre, Glasgow, where it will preview on 22 October 2014, with an official opening night the following day, running until 8 November. A typical performance runs two hours and 18 minutes, including one interval of 20 mins.

Principal roles and original cast

Notes

References

2014 plays
Plays set in Scotland
Scottish plays